St. Mary of the Assumption Church can refer to:
 St. Mary of the Assumption Catholic Church, School and Grottoes, Dwight, Nebraska
 St. Mary of the Assumption Church (Avilla, Indiana)
 St. Mary of the Assumption Church (Dedham, Massachusetts)
 St. Mary of the Assumption Church (Fort Worth)
 St. Mary of the Assumption Church and School, Park City, Utah

See also 
 St. Mary's Church (disambiguation)
 St. Mary's Assumption Church (disambiguation)